Mohabbat Jaye Bhar Mein is a Pakistani drama television series produced by Momina Duraid. Written by Fasih Bari Khan, it tells the story about a flat system where scandals are born galore. It premiered on Hum TV on 2 September 2012.

Plot
Mohabbat Jaye Bhar Mein is a story that focuses on characters from the middle class area of Karachi who live in the same apartment building.
It mainly focuses on two females, Shagufta and Neeli. Neeli is a high school girl who loves to live in a fantasy world. Trying to break out of the struggles of a low income family, Neeli tries to date boys that have money so they can buy her things and take her out to fancy restaurants. Neeli's mother delivers a child every year. Due to many children in a low income family, and lack of attention for each child, none of the siblings get along with each other. Since, Neeli's parents cannot afford to buy them the nicer things in life, Neeli and her sister escape to Shagufta's house to borrow make up, jewelry, and clothes.

Shagufta is an attractive woman, admired by many men who want to be romantically involved with her. She is unmarried and although, she does not physically go to work, she makes her income from owning partial shares of a nearby shop. Shagufta has a mother who is mentally insane and a brother affected by Down Syndrome. Shagufta is often misunderstood by her neighbours, who look down on her for being single, having a crazy mother and going out late at night (usually to meet with men). Jealous of Shagufta's good looks, many neighbours, including Neeli's mother think that Shagufta is a whore but deep down inside, Shagufta is a very caring woman and has a heart of gold, going above and beyond to help someone in need.

Shagufta falls in love with a cable technician that works in the apartments named Nasser, and she wants to marry him. Nasser is promiscuous and eventually falls for Neeli, whom he sees dancing at a friend's wedding.
When Shagufta and Neeli get into a fight, Neeli decideds to hurt Shagufta by starting an affair with Nasser.

Other characters in the story such as Neeli's dad, Basharat, and older brother are also madly in love with Shagufta.
Mohabbat Jaye Bhar Mein, has many comedic scenes, but it is a far deeper drama, showing the viewers an internal pain and suffering of the many characters.

Cast

 Sajal Aly as Neeli
 Arisha Razi/Resham as Shagufta
 Hina Dilpazeer as Nasreen, Neeli's Mother
 Adnan Siddiqui as Basharat, Neeli's Father
 Imran Aslam as Nasir, Neeli and Shagufta's boy friend
 Minal Khan as Rani, Neeli's younger sister
 Fareeha Jabeen as Shagufta's mother
 Naeema Garaj as Zubeida, Nasreen's mother
 Raza Zaidi as Mubashir, Neeli's brother
 Nirvaan Nadeem as Tariq, Nasir's friend
 Fazal Hassain as Gullu, Neeli's brother
 Rashid Farooqi as Ismail, Nasreen's cousin
 Rehana Kaleem as Kokab, Nasreen's friend
 Sohail Masood as Shagufta's father (only in flashback)
 Ubaida Ansari as Zubeida's sister-in-law
 Adnan Gabol as Shagufta's brother
 Zahida Batool
 Bilal Ahmad
 Syed Karam Hussain
 Mohammad Ali

Soundtrack 
Mohabbat Jaye Bhar Mein title song Mohabbat Bhar Mei Jaye is sung by Shibani Kashyap, composed by Shoaib Farrukh and Farrukh Abid and lyrics by Fasih Bari.

References 

Pakistani drama television series
Hum TV original programming
Pakistani comedy television series